"Get Set" is the debut single of Melbourne band Taxiride. The song was recorded at Ocean Way Studios, Los Angeles, and produced by Jack Joseph Puig. Released in May 1999, it peaked within the top 10 in Australia and also reached number 41 in New Zealand. At the ARIA Music Awards of 1999, the song was nominated for two awards: 'Breakthrough Artist – Single' and 'Best Pop Release', winning the former.

"Get Set" was used in the soundtrack of the 1999 film Election. In the film, the character Tammy is in her room listening to the song. A music video was also released, based on the film; it featured several scenes from the film, along with Taxiride playing in a studio. In 2002, this song was used for TV advertisement for Village Cinemas in Australia. In 2022 the song was used in an advertisement to visit Melbourne.

Track listing
Australian CD single
 "Get Set" – 3:14
 "Voodoo Doll Sin" – 3:36
 "Splash" – 3:20

Charts

Weekly charts

Year-end charts

References

1999 singles
1999 songs
ARIA Award-winning songs
Music videos directed by Liz Friedlander
Taxiride songs
Song recordings produced by Jack Joseph Puig
Warner Records singles